Vojtěch Řepa (born 14 August 2000) is a Czech cyclist, who currently rides for UCI ProTeam .

Major results 

2018
 3rd Road race, National Junior Road Championships
2020
 National Under-23 Road Championships
1st  Road race
3rd Time trial
 1st  Overall Tour of Małopolska
1st  Young rider classification
 3rd  Road race, UEC European Under-23 Road Championships
2022
 5th Overall Tour of Slovenia
1st  Young rider classification

Grand Tour general classification results timeline

References

External links

Czech male cyclists
Living people
2000 births
People from Žďár nad Sázavou District
Sportspeople from the Vysočina Region